Windhaag bei Perg is a municipality in the district of Perg in the Austrian state of Upper Austria.

Geography
Windhaag lies about 6 km north of Perg.

Population

References

Cities and towns in Perg District